Macartney "Mac" Abbott (3 July 1877 – 30 December 1960) was an Australian politician. Born in Murrurundi, New South Wales, he was educated at King's School, Parramatta. He became a farmer and grazier in the Upper Hunter area of New South Wales. He was the half brother of Joe Abbott, Member of the Australian House of Representatives (MP) for New England 1940–1949, and the cousin of Aubrey Abbott, MP for Gwydir 1925–1929 and 1931–1937. In 1913 he was elected to the New South Wales Legislative Assembly as the member for Upper Hunter, first as a Liberal and then from 1916 as a Nationalist. In 1918 he left the Assembly. In 1934 he was elected to the Australian Senate as a Country Party Senator for New South Wales. He was defeated in 1940. Abbott died in 1960.

References

 

Commonwealth Liberal Party politicians
Nationalist Party of Australia members of the Parliament of New South Wales
National Party of Australia members of the Parliament of Australia
Members of the Australian Senate for New South Wales
Members of the Australian Senate
Members of the New South Wales Legislative Assembly
1877 births
1960 deaths
20th-century Australian politicians